Below is the list of public parks or public gardens in the cities of Turkey. Note that nature parks and national parks are not included in this list.

Turkey geography-related lists
Parks in Turkey